was a Japanese actor and voice actor from Tokyo Prefecture and affiliated with Gekidan Bunkaza.

Roles

Television animation
Dog of Flanders (Bertrand)
Kamui the Ninja (Hansuke)
Kimba the White Lion (Coco)
Like the Clouds, Like the Wind (Sumito-sensei)
Norakuro (Bernard)
Ranma ½ Nettōhen (Chingensai)
Time Bokan (Emperor)
Andersen Stories (Painter, Father, Sea Lion)

OVA
Sakura Wars: Ouka Kenran (Kenjiji)

Dubbing roles
Harry Potter film series (Filius Flitwick (Warwick Davis))
Remo Williams: The Adventure Begins (Master Chiun (Joel Grey))
Return of the Jedi (TV edition) (Admiral Ackbar (Timothy M. Rose))

References

External links
 
 

1928 births
2015 deaths
Japanese male voice actors
Male voice actors from Tokyo Metropolis